Battle of Lwów or Battle of Lemberg refers to a battle in or about the city of Lviv (Lvov, Lwów, Lemberg); and may specifically refer to:

 Battle of Lwów (1675), a battle in which Ottoman armies were defeated by Poles under John III Sobieski
 Battle of Lwów (1694), a battle in which Ottoman armies were defeated by Hussars under hetman Stanisław Jan Jabłonowski
 Battle of Lemberg (1704), a battle in which Lwów was captured and looted by Sweden during the Great Northern War
 Battle of Lemberg (1914) of Battle of Galicia, a battle in which Lemberg was captured by Russia at the outbreak of World War I
 Battle of Lemberg (1915), a battle in which Lviv was recaptured by Austria-Hungary; included the 4th Division
 Battle of Lemberg (1918), urban fighting between local Polish inhabitants and the forces of West Ukrainian People's Republic
 Battle of Lwów (1920), fights of several weeks' duration at the outskirts of the city between the Polish Army and the Red Army during the Polish–Bolshevik War
 Battle of Lwów (1939), a siege of Lwów by Germany during the Invasion of Poland of 1939 at the outbreak of World War II; capitulated to the Soviet Union
 Battle of Lwów (1941), an engagement which saw the city fall to the Germans in 1941
 Lvov–Sandomierz Offensive, a 1944 offensive by the Soviet Union against Germany
 Lwów Uprising, a 1944 battle in which the city was captured by the Polish Home Army and the Soviet Union during World War II